Bridgend or Bridge End is a village in County Donegal, Ireland, at the base of the Inishowen peninsula. It is located on the road to Letterkenny, on the western outskirts of Derry and near the border between the Republic of Ireland and Northern Ireland.

History
Bridgend was one of several Protestant villages in eastern Donegal that would have been transferred to Northern Ireland, had the recommendations of the Irish Boundary Commission been enacted in 1925.

Schools
The national school or primary school in Bridgend is called St. Aengus' National School. Traditionally, children resident in Bridgend attend secondary schools in Buncrana - Scoil Mhuire (Convent of Mercy) and Crana College (formerly Buncrana Vocational School or more commonly known as the 'tech').

Parish and townlands

Bridgend is part of Fahan parish which takes in Fahan, Burt and Inch.

The main townlands of Bridgend include Carrowreagh and Bunamayne (or Bonemaine). They are divided by a river which runs through Bridgend, with Carrowreagh to the north and Bunamayne to the south of the river. Other townlands of Bridgend include Tummock which is a back road running parallel to the Burt main road.

Sport
Traditionally, children of St. Aengus' N.S. have gone on to play for the local GAA club which is Burt GAC. They have also continued to play for the Club long after they progress to secondary and third level education.

See also
 List of populated places in Ireland

References

External links

St. Aengus' National School

Towns and villages in County Donegal